The Department for the Economy (DfE) is a devolved Northern Ireland government department in the Northern Ireland Executive. The minister with overall responsibility for the department is the Minister for the Economy.

DfE was renamed in 2016; it was previously called the Department for Enterprise, Trade and Investment.

Aim
DfE's overall aim is to "promote the development of a globally competitive economy." Its stated objective is to "encourage the development of a high value added, innovative, enterprising and competitive economy, leading to greater wealth creation and job opportunities for all."

The position was vacant until 11 January 2020.

Responsibilities
The department is responsible for the following policy areas:
 company registration (prior to commencement of the Companies Act 2006 on 1 October 2009)
 consumer affairs
 economic policy development
 energy
 health and safety at work
 insolvency
 mineral development
 tourism

Some economic matters are reserved to Westminster and are therefore not devolved: 

 the foreshore, sea bed and subsoil and their natural resources
 postal services
 import and export controls, external trade
 national minimum wage
 financial services
 financial markets
 intellectual property
 units of measurement
 telecommunications and internet services
 consumer safety in relation to goods

In addition, some matters are excepted and were not intended for devolution:
 taxation
 national insurance
 currency
 nuclear energy

DfE's main counterparts in the United Kingdom Government are:
 the Department for Business, Energy and Industrial Strategy (BEIS)
 the Department for Digital, Culture, Media and Sport (DCMS)

In the Irish Government, its main counterparts are:
 the Department of Enterprise, Trade and Employment;
 the Department of the Environment, Climate and Communications;
 the Department of Transport;

Agencies
DfE has four agencies, established as non-departmental public bodies (NDPBs), to assist in strategy implementation: 
 Invest Northern Ireland (Invest NI), which supports business growth and inward investment, promotes innovation, research and development and in-company training, encourages exports and supports local economic development and company start up;
 the Northern Ireland Tourist Board (NITB), which is responsible for the development, promotion and marketing of Northern Ireland as a tourist destination;
 the Health and Safety Executive for Northern Ireland (HSENI), which is responsible for health, safety and welfare at work; and
 the General Consumer Council for Northern Ireland (GCCNI), which is responsible for promoting and safeguarding the interests of consumers and campaigning for the best possible standards of service and protection.

History
A Ministry of Commerce was established at the foundation of Northern Ireland in June 1921, and was subsequently known as the Department of Commerce and Department of Economic Development under direct rule (introduced in March 1972). An economic ministry was also included in the Northern Ireland Executive briefly established in 1974.

The Department of Economic Development also incorporated elements of training and employment policy, now held by the Department for Employment and Learning.

Following a referendum on the Belfast Agreement on 23 May 1998 and the granting of royal assent to the Northern Ireland Act 1998 on 19 November 1998, a Northern Ireland Assembly and Northern Ireland Executive were established by the United Kingdom Government under Prime Minister Tony Blair. The Department of Economic Development was renamed as the Department of Enterprise, Trade and Investment and granted a reduced remit. DETI was therefore one of the six direct rule Northern Ireland departments that continued in existence after devolution in December 1999, following the Northern Ireland Act 1998 and The Departments (Northern Ireland) Order 1999.

A devolved minister took office on 2 December 1999. Devolution was suspended for four periods, during which the department came under the responsibility of direct rule ministers from the Northern Ireland Office:
 between 12 February 2000 and 30 May 2000;
 on 11 August 2001;
 on 22 September 2001;
 between 15 October 2002 and 8 May 2007.

Since 8 May 2007, devolution has operated without interruption. The Independent Review of Economic Policy, which reported in September 2009, recommended a single economic policy department within the Northern Ireland Executive, which would merge DETI and at least part of the Department for Employment and Learning.

On 11 January 2012, the First Minister and deputy First Minister, Peter Robinson and Martin McGuinness announced their intentions to abolish the Department for Employment and Learning. The department's functions would be "divided principally" between the Department of Education and the Department of Enterprise, Trade and Investment "in an agreed manner".
The proposal was resisted by the Alliance Party, which viewed it as "power grab" by the Democratic Unionist Party and Sinn Féin, but was approved on 18 January 2012. No timescale for the abolition was outlined and the department remained in operation, as of late March 2012.

DETI was heavily criticised by the Northern Ireland Audit Office for its mismanagement of a broadband scheme starting in 2004 and carried out by Bytel Networks, which saw Bytel receive over a million euros in a European Union grant for equipment that was never used. DETI subsequently sued Bytel in an attempt to reclaim more than four million euros.

In 2016, the Renewable Heat Incentive scandal came to light which was a botched scheme that was run by DETI, now Department for the Economy. The minister in charge at the time, Arlene Foster, faced pressure to resign as the scheme cost the NI Executive £400m over 20 years.

Ministers for the Economy

Direct rule ministers
During the periods of suspension, the following ministers of the Northern Ireland Office were responsible for the department:

Adam Ingram (2000)
Ian Pearson (2002–04)
Barry Gardiner (2004–05)
Angela Smith (2005–06)
Maria Eagle (2006–07)

See also
Committee for the Economy
List of government ministers in Northern Ireland

References

External links
 DfE
  

Northern Ireland Executive
Economy of Northern Ireland
Trade ministries
Northern Ireland
Northern Ireland